Clayton is an unincorporated community in Tunica County, Mississippi.

References

Unincorporated communities in Tunica County, Mississippi
Unincorporated communities in Mississippi
Memphis metropolitan area